Yahşi Batı is a 2010 Turkish comedy film, directed by Ömer Faruk Sorak, which stars Cem Yılmaz as special agents tasked by the Sultan of the Ottoman Empire to deliver a diamond gift to the American president. The title Yahşi Batı ("Mild West") is a play on the term Vahşi Batı ("Wild West").

Plot
Two special agents, Aziz and Lemi, are tasked by the Sultan of the Ottoman Empire with delivering a diamond as a gift to the American president. As they ride on a stagecoach across the American wild west, they are robbed of the diamond by bandits, leaving them stranded without any money. A tough cowgirl, Susanne Van Dyke (a character like Calamity Jane) joins them on their quest.

Cast

Release

The film later opened in one screen in the UK with a first weekend gross of £557.

Reception

Box office
The film was number one at the Turkish box office for two weeks running and has made a total gross of $13,733,563.

See also 
 2010 in film
 Turkish films of 2010

References

External links
  for the film (Turkish)
 
 
 
 

2010 films
2010 comedy films
2010s Western (genre) comedy films
2010s parody films
Films set in Istanbul
Films set in Turkey
Turkish Western (genre) comedy films
2010s Turkish-language films